
AD 48 (XLVIII) was a leap year starting on Monday (link will display the full calendar) of the Julian calendar. At the time, it was known as the Year of the Consulship of Vitellius and Poplicola (or, less frequently, year 801 Ab urbe condita). The denomination AD 48 for this year has been used since the early medieval period, when the Anno Domini calendar era became the prevalent method in Europe for naming years.

Events

By place

Roman Empire 
 Emperor Claudius invests Agrippa II with the office of superintendent of the Temple in Jerusalem.
 After the execution of his wife Messalina, Claudius gets senatorial approval to marry his niece, Agrippina the Younger.
 Publius Ostorius Scapula, governor of Britain, announces his intention to disarm all Britons south and east of the Trent and Severn. The Iceni, an independent, allied kingdom within that area, revolt but are defeated. Ostorius then moves against the Deceangli in north Wales, but is forced to abandon the campaign to deal with a revolt among the allied Brigantes.
 Gallic nobles are admitted to the Roman Senate. Claudius grants the rights of citizenship to the Aedui.

China 
 Emperor Guang Wu of Han, restores Chinese domination of Inner Mongolia. The Xiongnu are made confederates and guard the Northern border of the empire.
 The Xiangnu empire dissolves.

Korea 
 Mobon becomes ruler of the Korean kingdom of Goguryeo.

By topic

Religion 
 Paul of Tarsus through his first mission goes to Cyprus and Asia Minor.
 According to Christian legend, Martha travels to Avignon.

Births 
 Cai Lun, Chinese inventor and politician (d. 121)
 Ulpia Marciana, sister of Trajan (d. 112)

Deaths 
 Gaius Silius, Roman politician (b. AD 13)
 Minjung, Korean ruler of Goguryeo
 Mnester, Roman pantomime actor
 Valeria Messalina, wife of Claudius

References 

0048

als:40er#48